Mary Nelson "Nellie" Spicer (born July 3, 1987) is an American indoor volleyball player. She is a  setter. Spicer is a member of the United States women's national volleyball team. She played college women's volleyball at UCLA.

References

1987 births
Living people
American women's volleyball players
Setters (volleyball)
People from Barrington, Illinois
Sportspeople from Illinois
American expatriate sportspeople in China
American expatriate sportspeople in Poland
American expatriate sportspeople in Azerbaijan
Expatriate volleyball players in China
Expatriate volleyball players in Poland
Expatriate volleyball players in Azerbaijan
UCLA Bruins women's volleyball players